The 1996–97 Omani League was the 23rd edition of the top football league in Oman. Sur SC were the defending champions, having won the previous 1995–96 Omani League season. Oman Club emerged as the champions of the 1996–97 Omani League with a total of 49 points.

Teams
This season the league had decreased from 14 to 12 teams. Al-Ahli Club, Buraimi SC, Al-Khaboura SC and Mirbat SC were relegated to the Second Division League after finishing in the relegation zone in the 1995–96 season. The four relegated teams were replaced Second Division League teams Sohar SC and Fanja SC.

Stadia and locations

League table

Season statistics

Top scorers

Top level Omani football league seasons
1996–97 in Omani football
Oman